Mitochondrially encoded tRNA alanine also known as MT-TA is a transfer RNA, which in humans is encoded by the mitochondrial MT-TA gene.

MT-TA is a small 69 nucleotide RNA (human mitochondrial map position 5587-5655) that transfers the amino acid alanine to a growing polypeptide chain at the ribosome site of protein synthesis during translation.

It has been reported that the 5650G-A mutation on MT-TA may cause muscular dystrophy.

References